Go Dae-woo (born 9 February 1987) is a South Korean footballer who plays as a midfielder.

External links 

1987 births
Living people
Association football midfielders
South Korean footballers
Daejeon Hana Citizen FC players
FC Anyang players
K League 1 players
K League 2 players
Sportspeople from Busan